The  are a Japanese women's softball team based in Yokohama, Kanagawa. The Sundiva compete in the Japan Diamond Softball League (JD.League) as a member of the league's East Division.

History
The Sundiva were founded in 1985 as Hitachi Software (a factory of Hitachi) softball team.

The Japan Diamond Softball League (JD.League) was founded in 2022, and the Sundiva became part of the new league as a member of the East Division.

Roster

References

External links
 
 Hitachi Sundiva - JD.League
 
 

Japan Diamond Softball League
Women's softball teams in Japan
Sports teams in Yokohama